Gilbert Gunn (24 March 1905 – 6 December 1967) was a British screenwriter and film director.

Selected filmography
Screenwriter
 Save a Little Sunshine (1938)
 Me and My Pal (1939)
 The Door with Seven Locks (1940)

Director
 Valley of Song (1953)
 My Wife's Family (1956)
 Girls at Sea (1958)
 Operation Bullshine (1959)
 What a Whopper (1961)

Actor
 The Farmer's Wife  (1941)

References

External links

1905 births
1967 deaths
Film people from Glasgow
Scottish film directors
British male screenwriters
20th-century British screenwriters